Standings and results for Group 7 of the UEFA Euro 1996 qualifying tournament.

Standings

Results

Goalscorers

References

A. Yelagin - History of European Championships 1960-2000 (Terra-Sport, Moscow, 2002) - attendance information

External links
 UEFA Euro 1996 qualifying Group 7 at UEFA.com

Group 7
1994–95 in Bulgarian football
1995–96 in Bulgarian football
Bulgaria at UEFA Euro 1996
1994–95 in Welsh football
1995–96 in Welsh football
1994–95 in German football
Qual
1994–95 in Georgian football
1995–96 in Georgian football
1994–95 in Moldovan football
1995–96 in Moldovan football
1994–95 in Albanian football
1995–96 in Albanian football